Lev L'Achim ("heart for brothers"), or P'eylim Lev L'Achim, is a Jewish educational organization operating in Israel. It has an American non-profit 501(c)3 affiliate of the same name.

Work
Lev L'Achim's programs include: enrolling Jewish children in religious schools, operating Torah learning centers for teens and adults, assisting immigrants, shelters for abused women, big-brother programs, and drop-out prevention. The organization has also assisted in rescuing Jewish Israeli women held in captivity in the Palestinian territories and participated in opposing Christian missionary work in Israel.

Controversy
In 2009, the U.S. State Department, in its annual International Religious Freedom Report, noted that Israeli "society's attitudes toward missionary activities and conversion generally were negative. Most Jews were opposed to missionary activity directed at Jews, and some were hostile to Jewish converts to Christianity." In that context, the report named Lev L'Achim as one of the groups of "concern" for their work against Christian missionaries operating in Israel.

See also
Shuvu Chazon Avrohom
Judaism in Israel
Missionary
Proselytization and counter-proselytization of Jews
Lehava

References

External links
 Operation Mobilization
 Heart Cry Missionary Society
 The Christian and Missionary Alliance
 One for Israel
 "Missionary work in Israel a silent Holocaust"
 Yad L'Achim

Jewish organizations based in Israel
Jewish outreach
Jewish counter-missionaries
Rabai Shech